Mitsubishi Cable Industries Soccer Club was a Japanese football club based in Osaka. The club has played in Japan Soccer League Division 2. They last played in the Osaka Prefectural Leagues.

Club name
?–1987 : Dainichi Nippon Cable SC
1987–2009 : Mitsubishi Cable Industries SC

External links
Football of Japan

Football clubs in Japan
Japan Soccer League clubs
Football clubs in Osaka Prefecture
Defunct football clubs in Japan
Works association football clubs in Japan